935 Clivia belongs to the Flora family of Main Belt asteroids. Its diameter is about 7.9 km and it has an albedo of 0.197 .

References

External links 
 
 

000935
Discoveries by Karl Wilhelm Reinmuth
Named minor planets
19200907